Calde is a civil parish in the municipality of Viseu, in Portugal. The population in 2011 was 1271 and population density was 36 inhabitants per square kilometre, in an area of 35.06 km2.

References 

Freguesias of Viseu